The 2020–21 Professional U23 Development League was the ninth season of the Professional Development League system.

Burnley, Crystal Palace and Leeds United joined the Premier League 2 for the 2020–21 season after gaining category one status academies. Prior to the start of the season Swansea City left the league after downgrading their academy to category two.

Premier League 2

Division 1

Table

Results

Division 2

Table

Results

Play-offs

See also
 2020–21 in English football

References

2020–21 in English football leagues
2020–21